is a Japanese suspense manga series written and illustrated by Daruma Matsuura. It was published in Kodansha's seinen manga magazine Evening from April 2013 to August 2018, with its chapters compiled into fourteen tankōbon volumes.  A live-action film adaptation was released in September 2018. In North America, the series is licensed for English digital release by Kodansha USA.

Characters
Kasane Fuchi
Played by: Kyoko Yoshine
An extremely ugly girl constantly tormented by bullies, in her youth, for her appearance and the fact that her mother was an incredible beauty. Despite her appearance she can act with amazing skill and grace. But due to the torment she faced as a child and her own sense of inferiority, she cannot act in front of anyone as herself. She received a tube of lipstick as a keepsake from her mother before she died. This tube has magic that allows Kasane to take whatever she wants if she kisses it while wearing the lipstick, usually the face of another person. While wearing another person's face, she loses her sense of inferiority and can act nearly flawlessly.
Nina Tanzawa
Played by: Tao Tsuchiya
A beautiful woman, who desires to be a stage actress, but lacks talent as well as suffering from Sleeping Beauty syndrome. She agrees to give her face to Kasane, as long as she gets the credit for everything. However as time goes on, she begins to become dissatisfied with this relationship, sad and angry that her talent is not recognized. She eventually, sneaks on stage during a rehearsal instead of Kasane, but when her performance is declared completely different from "her" previous ones, she tries to commit suicide, but only lands up in a coma. Kasane keeps her body, at her home, alive, giving her the title of Kasane and taking Nina's name for her own.
Kingo Habuta
Played by: Tadanobu Asano
Sukeyo and later Kasane's manager. He is one of the few people who knows the truth of Kasane's and Sukeyo's appearances and how they changed. He greatly admires both of their acting skills. He begins to help Kasane on the request of her mother before she died, and now he hopes to make Kasane into an actress as well known as Sukeyo, and hopefully even better. He was originally a director and he had cast Sukeyo.
Sukeyo Fuchi
Played by: Rei Dan
Kasane's mother who died in the beginning of the story. She left Kasane a tube of lipstick, with odd properties, that allows Kasane to switch faces with another person, when she kisses them. She was a well-known actor, but it is eventually revealed that she, too used the lipstick, as Kasane presently does. 
Ichika Nishizawa
An Elementary-school classmate of Kasane. She was the leader of the bullies in elementary school. She attempted to mock her further by nominating Kasane as Cinderella for the class play and preventing her from practising with everyone else, but the plan backfired when Kasane practiced on her own, and still ended up shining in the first half of the performance. She later threatened Kasane to give up her position as Cinderella for the rest of the play, but Kasane switched faces with her, and locked her in the bathroom, passing herself off as Nishizawa for the remaining performance. After the play, she took Nishizawa to the roof, where she attempted to make peace with her, but failed. In the resulting scuffle, Kasane's cheek was sliced open, resulting in a permanent scar, while Nishizawa fell from the roof to her death. 
Iku Igarashi
The second person, Kasane switched faces with. She was a senior to Kasane, as well as the captain of the acting club. A kind, and loving girl, she attempted to befriend Kasane, by admitting that she too was bullied in her past, and that they were not very different. Her attempts failed when the other members of the club revealed to Kasane that Iku was bullied because of her beauty, as compared to Kasane's ugliness, and that the difference between them couldn't be wider. Hurt and feeling betrayed, Kasane confirmed the truth from Iku, and unable to hate Iku, she could only pity the Ugly girls who had once bullied Iku for being compared to her, just as she was. Kasane then drugged Iku, and took her place for her performance in a play, before returning her face to her and later telling Iku to stay away from her forever.

Media

Manga
Kasane is written and illustrated by Daruma Matsuura. The manga started in Kodansha's seinen manga magazine Evening on April 23, 2013. It finished in the magazine on August 10, 2018. Kodansha has compiled its chapters into fourteen individual tankōbon volumes, published from October 23, 2013 to September 7, 2018.

Kodansha USA announced the digital release of the manga in May 2017.

Volume list

Film
A live-action film adaptation was announced in 2018, starring Kyoko Yoshine as Kasane Fuchi and Tao Tsuchiya as Nina Tanzawa. The film is directed by Yūichi Satō, with Tsutomu Kuroiwa written the scripts, and Yugo Kanno composed the music. It was released in Japan on September 7, 2018. The theme song for the film is "Black Bird" by Aimer.

Reception
Volume 5 of Kasane reached the 39th place on Oricon's weekly manga charts and, as of March 29, 2015, had sold 31,029 copies.

It was placed 9th in Zenkoku Shotenin ga Eranda Osusume Comic 2015. It placed 10th out of 14 nominees at the 8th Manga Taishō with 30 points. It was also nominated for Best General Manga at the 39th Kodansha Manga Awards. The series ranked tenth in the first Next Manga Award in the print manga category.

The lyrics to the 2019 song "Karma" by heavy metal band Mary's Blood were inspired by Kasane.

References

External links
 

2013 manga
Dark fantasy anime and manga
Japanese thriller films
Kodansha manga
Seinen manga
Suspense anime and manga
Theatre in anime and manga